Summerseat is a village in the Metropolitan Borough of Bury, Greater Manchester, England, directly south of Ramsbottom.

History
Historically part of Lancashire, Summerseat lies in the Irwell Valley, on the course of the River Irwell to the north of Bury and along the route of the M66 motorway.

Summerseat railway station on the East Lancashire steam railway is in the village. The village has a Costcutter store and two public houses, the Footballer's and the Hamer's Arms.

The 200-year-old Grade II listed Joshua Hoyles cotton mill on the banks of the Irwell was redeveloped into residential apartments in the 1980s. The Waterside Inn, built on Kay Street Bridge as a creche for the adjacent mill, was also to have been redeveloped as residences but collapsed during a storm in December 2015 which also damaged the bridge. The bridge has since been rebuilt  and the road across it is in use.

References

Geography of the Metropolitan Borough of Bury
Villages in Greater Manchester
Ramsbottom